Lane County is one of the 36 counties in the U.S. state of Oregon. As of the 2020 census, the population was 382,971, making it the fourth-most populous county in Oregon. The county seat is Eugene. It is named in honor of Joseph Lane, Oregon's first territorial governor.

Lane County comprises the Eugene, OR Metropolitan Statistical Area. It is the third-largest MSA in Oregon, and the 144th-largest in the country.

History
Lane County was established on January 29, 1851. It was created from the southern part of Linn County and the portion of Benton County east of Umpqua County. It was named after the territory's first governor, Joseph Lane. Originally it covered all of southern Oregon east to the Cascade Mountains and south to the California border. When the Territorial Legislature created Lane County, it did not designate a county seat. In the 1853 election, four sites competed for the designation, of which the "Mulligan donation" received a majority vote; however, since it was contiguous to the "Skinner claim" both became part of the new county seat known as Eugene.

In 1846, Elijah Bristow and his wife, the former Susannah Gabbart, had become the first white settlers to build a claim cabin within the present-day boundaries of Lane County, near Pleasant Hill. They had crossed the plains to California in the previous year, and came north with Eugene F. Skinner, Captain Felix Scott, and William Dodson. As their party entered the valley between the Coast Fork and Middle Fork of the Willamette River, Bristow gazed around and exclaimed, "What a pleasant hill! Here is my home!"

In 1852, John Diamond and William Macy led an exploration party to survey a shortcut for the Oregon Trail across the Cascade Range. The shortcut over the Willamette Pass became known as the Free Emigrant Road. Around 250 wagons with 1,027 people left the usual Oregon Trail route at Vale, Oregon, and followed Elijah Elliott through the central Oregon high desert. This became known as the Elliott Cutoff. When they reached what is now Bend, they sent scouts to the south to look for the road. Once settlers in the Willamette Valley discovered the emigrants were coming, a huge rescue effort was launched as the emigrants were out of supplies and in dire condition. The emigrants of this wagon train doubled the population of Lane County in 1853.

The county has been vastly reduced from its original size by several boundary changes. One of the first changes gave it access to the Pacific Ocean, when it acquired the northern part of Umpqua County in 1853. With the creation of Wasco County in 1854, it lost all of its territory east of the Cascade Mountains. Minor boundary changes occurred with Douglas County in 1852, 1885, 1903, 1915, and 1917; with Linn County in 1907 and with Benton County in 1923.

Geography

Lane County is one of two Oregon counties that extend from the Pacific Ocean to the Cascades (the other is Douglas County.) A portion of the Umpqua National Forest is in Lane County. Portions of the Willamette, McKenzie, and Siuslaw rivers run through the county.

Adjacent counties
 Lincoln County (northwest)
 Benton County (north)
 Linn County (northeast)
 Deschutes County (east)
 Klamath County (southeast)
 Douglas County (south)

National protected areas
Oregon Islands National Wildlife Refuge (part)
Siuslaw National Forest (part)
Umpqua National Forest (part)
Willamette National Forest (part)

Demographics

2000 census
As of the census of 2000, there were 322,959 people, 130,453 households, and 82,185 families living in the county. The population density was 71 people per square mile (27/km2). There were 138,946 housing units at an average density of 30 per square mile (12/km2). The racial makeup of the county was 90.64% White, 0.78% Black or African American, 1.13% Native American, 2.00% Asian, 0.19% Pacific Islander, 1.95% from other races, and 3.32% from two or more races. 4.61% of the population were Hispanic or Latino of any race.

There were 130,453 households, out of which 28.50% had children under the age of 18 living with them, 48.90% were married couples living together, 10.00% had a female householder with no husband present, and 37.00% were non-families. 26.60% of all households were made up of individuals, and 9.10% had someone living alone who was 65 years of age or older.  The average household size was 2.42 and the average family size was 2.92.

In the county, the population was spread out, with 22.90% under the age of 18, 12.00% from 18 to 24, 27.50% from 25 to 44, 24.40% from 45 to 64, and 13.30% who were 65 years of age or older.  The median age was 37 years. For every 100 females there were 96.90 males.  For every 100 females age 18 and over, there were 94.70 males.

The median income for a household in the county was $36,942, and the median income for a family was $45,111. Males had a median income of $34,358 versus $25,103 for females. The per capita income for the county was $19,681. About 9.00% of families and 14.40% of the population were below the poverty line, including 16.10% of those under age 18 and 7.50% of those age 65 or over.

2010 census
As of the 2010 census, there were 351,715 people, 145,966 households, and 86,938 families living in the county. The racial makeup of the county was 88.3% white, 2.4% Asian, 1.2% American Indian, 1.0% black or African American, 0.2% Pacific islander, 2.8% from other races, and 4.2% from two or more races. Those of Hispanic or Latino origin made up 7.4% of the population. In terms of ancestry, 21.8% were German, 14.9% were English, 13.8% were Irish, and 5.3% were American.

Of the 145,966 households, 26.3% had children under the age of 18 living with them, 44.3% were married couples living together, 10.6% had a female householder with no husband present, 40.4% were non-families, and 28.9% of all households were made up of individuals. The average household size was 2.35 and the average family size was 2.87. The median age was 39.0 years.

The median income for a household in the county was $42,923 and the median income for a family was $55,817. Males had a median income of $43,383 versus $32,745 for females. The per capita income for the county was $23,869. About 10.0% of families and 16.7% of the population were below the poverty line, including 17.1% of those under age 18 and 8.7% of those age 65 or over.

Lane County is the fourth-most populous county in Oregon. It grew more slowly from 2000 to 2010 than did the three larger counties, Multnomah (the most populous Oregon county), Washington and Clackamas.

2020 Census
The racial and ethnic make up of the county was 77.9% non-Hispanic White, 1.1% African American, 0.9% Native American, 2.5% Asian, 6.9% mixed race of two or more, and 9.9% Hispanic.

Government
Lane County is governed by a County commission.  Commissioners are elected officials and serve four-year terms.  The current commissioners are:
Joe Berney, Springfield
Jay Bozievich, West Lane
Heather Buch, East Lane
Laurie Trieger, South Eugene
Pat Farr, North Eugene

In presidential elections, while Lane County has mostly leaned towards Republican candidates in the past, it has become solidly Democratic since 1984.

Economy
Growth in the next decades is predicted to shift away from timber and agriculture to services, manufacturing of transportation equipment, printing and publishing, and high technology. As of July 2008, PeaceHealth Medical Group is the largest private employer in Lane County.

Communities

Incorporated cities

Coburg
Cottage Grove
Creswell
Dunes City
Eugene (county seat)
Florence
Junction City
Lowell
Oakridge
Springfield
Veneta
Westfir

Census-designated places

Cheshire
Dexter
Elmira
Heceta Beach
Jasper
Mapleton
Marcola
River Road
Santa Clara
Trent

Other unincorporated communities

Ada
Alma
Alpha
Alvadore
Austa
Belknap Springs
Blachly
Black Butte
Blue River
Bohemia City
Brickerville
Camp Creek
Canary
Cedar Flat
Cloverdale
Crow
Culp Creek
Cushman
Deadwood
Deerhorn
Disston
Divide
Dorena
Fall Creek
Finn Rock
Flagg
Franklin
Gillespie Corners
Glenada
Glenwood
Goldson
Goshen
Greenleaf
Horton
Indiola
Inlow
Lancaster
Latham
Leaburg
Linslaw
London Springs
Lorane
Low Pass
Luper
Mabel
Malabon
McCredie Springs
McKenzie Bridge
Minerva
Mohawk
Natron
Nimrod
North Beach
Noti
Pleasant Hill
Rainbow
Riverview
Saginaw
Searose Beach
Siltcoos
Swisshome
Tide
Tiernan
Triangle Lake
Unity
Vaughn
Vida
Walden
Walker
Walterville
Walton
Wendling
Westlake
Wildwood

Former communities
Bethel, now part of Eugene
Irving, now part of Eugene
Thurston, now part of Springfield

See also

 Lane Education Service District
 National Register of Historic Places listings in Lane County, Oregon

References

Further reading

External links

Convention and Visitors Association of Lane County, Oregon
Lane County History Museum—information on the history of Lane County

1851 establishments in Oregon Territory
 
Populated places established in 1851